Scarlett Raven (born 1986) is an English painter who paints impressionism paintings using a style called Augmented reality.

Early life and education

She is the daughter of the musician Raphael Ravenscroft, most known for his saxophone riff in the song "Baker Street" by Gerry Rafferty, and author S.C. Cunningham, who writes suspense thrillers and children's books. She is the granddaughter of Trevor Ravenscroft, who wrote the occult book The Spear of Destiny in 1972.

Raven studied fine art at Central St Martins in London.

Career
Raven began as a fine artist, choosing paint and canvas as her primary medium, but now identifies as an Augmentist. She paints Impressionism, but uses augmented reality to reveal a richer experience behind the creation of each painting.

Raven's original works have been purchased by notable personalities including Orlando Bloom, Take That band member Mark Owen, and Jim Beach, manager of rock group Queen.

Raven's approach has developed a body of work that takes the visual element of a painting beyond the canvas through the use of augmented reality. Augmented Reality allows an immersive experience of her art. It enables Raven to document the creative journey and offers a new method of artistic expression. The concept Raven has pioneered has been described as bridging a gap between digital and tangible art and she is now considered by some as the World's First Augmented Reality Fine Artist.

Augmentism 

In 2012, Raven used her body as a canvas to create a stop-motion film, the film documented her painting process. Speaking on the film, Raven said she "liked the idea that art in analogue form could embrace a digital medium."

Raven is mentored and managed by digital artist Marc Marot. Marot was the first to encourage Raven to develop the initial concept further and explore the idea of using Augmented Reality in her paintings. Since adopting the process people can now stand in front of Raven's paintings and use technology to interact with the physical canvas.

Raven embeds a number of inputs into the artwork, at first physically with paint, then digitally using a variety of techniques. The full experience of the paintings can then be unlocked by using the Blippar app. To produce an Augmented Reality painting it takes tens of thousands of images, overlaid and layered.

Raven incorporates different techniques, including blue screen, time-lapse, stop-motion and sound when creating her paintings.

Raven has said exploring the route of Augmented Reality has changed the way she works immeasurably, commenting: "The process has evolved my relationship with art forever."

The layers beneath Raven's paintings are accessed using the Blippar app. Blippar is one of a selection of technology companies that make Augmented Reality possible. This technology delivers a capability that makes immersive art accessible to mobile device users. Raven's motive behind using Augmentism is driven by her desire to encourage people to engage with artwork beyond the canvas and beyond the gallery.

Exhibitions 
Raven's work can be found at The Danger Tree exhibit in Liverpool, England.
In 2012, Raven's father, Raphael Ravenscroft, visited France and traveled to the location of The Somme. He visited the original Danger Tree, a feature which marked the spot where, in 1916, troops from The Newfoundlanders—part of the 29th British Division – gathered for shelter on the opening day of the Battle of the Somme. The tree marks the spot where many of the Newfoundlanders lost their lives. Ravenscroft took a memento of soil from the ground where the Danger Tree once stood. When Ravenscroft died, Raven made the same journey to the Danger Tree which inspired the 2016 exhibition.

Raven said: “I felt an enormous loss. I also felt a huge connection, through my father, with that part of history. That became the catalyst for The Danger Tree exhibition. I wanted to draw attention to the humanity behind the horror. It is my interpretation of a devastating, yet also touching, part of human history.”

The exhibition featured oil on canvas paintings with augmented reality layers.

She was also seen at Queen Themed, an exhibition of Queen Elizabeth in celebration of her 90th birthday. The show was at Art Below on Jun 17-Aug 17, 2016.

Her art is featured at The 11th Hour at Castle Fine Art gallery in Birmingham, England.

Mental health charity MIND helped Raven through a difficult period in her life. She created and donated an oil and mixed media AR painting called "One In Four" for them to auction. The layers beneath this work tell the story of Scarlett's battle with anxiety.

References 

1986 births
Living people
Alumni of Central Saint Martins
English women painters
21st-century British women artists
21st-century English women
21st-century English people